All Saints Church is an Anglican church in the parish of Spofforth and Kirk Deighton in North Yorkshire, England.

History
The earliest parts of the church are of Norman origin, however the church was remodelled somewhat in the 15th century.  The 15th-century enlargements were thought to be unnecessary after the building of a church in Wetherby and the church was again remodelled in 1854–55 by JW Hugall, with the nave and chancel being returned to Norman style.

In 1971 the ecclesiastical parishes of Spofforth, Kirk Deighton, Follifoot and Little Ribston were merged to form the Parish of Spofforth and Kirk Deighton in the Diocese of Ripon. The parish transferred to the Diocese of Leeds in 2014.

The blind road-builder John Metcalf (1717-1810) is buried in the churchyard.

Buildings

The buildings are Grade II* listed.  Most of the current church dates back from the 1854–55 remodelling under the Reverend James Tripp, however the tower is 15th century and contains four bells; three of which date from the late 16th or early 17th century.

See also
All Saints' Church, Kirk Deighton

References

External links

Parish of Spofforth and Kirk Deighton – Spofforth
A Church Near You

Spofforth
Spofforth, All Saints' Parish Church
Grade II* listed churches in North Yorkshire
Spofforth, North Yorkshire